James Peter Brown (born 3 January 1987) is a retired English footballer who played as a winger.

Brown started out as a striker for Football League side Hartlepool United but started playing on the wing during the club's promotion season in 2006–07. Brown also spent two seasons in the National League for Gateshead. Brown's career was ravaged by injuries and he retired from professional football aged 27, following this he played part-time for Northern Premier League side Whitby Town for two seasons.

Career

Hartlepool United
Born in Cramlington, Northumberland, Brown joined Hartlepool's youth set-up from Cramlington Juniors football Club. He had joined too late to go through the Youth Scholarship system and was subsequently offered a temporary deal. He was part of the successful Hartlepool under 19s side that won the Dallas Cup XXV in 2004. James Brown was included on the substitutes bench for Hartlepool's match against AFC Bournemouth on the last day of the 2004–05 season. He was expected to play a part in the Hartlepool's 2005–06 campaign and participated regularly during pre-season. However, during pre-season, Brown ruptured his cruciate ligament against Hibernian and missed the majority of the subsequent season.

On 6 May 2006, Brown made his comeback from injury by making his debut for the club, coming off the bench to score in the 1–1 draw with Port Vale at Victoria Park. The game was bittersweet for Brown as Hartlepool's failure to win saw them relegated to League Two. James's finishing earned him his first professional contract with the club in 2006. During the 2006–07 campaign, he played nearly all of Hartlepool's games on the right wing as the club won promotion back to League One.

In August 2008, Brown signed a new long-term contract with Hartlepool. It was reported on 27 August 2008 that Celtic were interested in signing Brown after he was scouted by manager Gordon Strachan during Hartlepool's 3-1 League Cup win against Premier League side West Brom. The Daily Record reported that Tottenham Hotspur, Norwich City and Wolverhampton Wanderers were also monitoring Brown's progress.

Brown was released by Hartlepool on 10 May 2012. His time at Hartlepool was plagued by injuries which included two cruciate ligament injuries, an ankle injury and a persistent knee problem.

Gateshead
Brown signed for Conference Premier side Gateshead on 6 June 2012. His debut was delayed due to requiring surgery on a double hernia. He eventually made his Gateshead debut on 6 October 2012 as a second-half substitute in a 1–1 draw against Hyde. He made his first start for Gateshead three days later in a 2–2 draw with Macclesfield Town. Brown scored his first goal for Gateshead on 22 February 2013 in the return game against Macclesfield Town. He made his 50th appearance for Gateshead on 11 January 2014, scoring in a 2–1 win over Nuneaton Town. 

Aged 27, Brown retired from professional football in November 2014 due to a persistent knee injury. Gateshead manager Gary Mills said of Brown's retirement: "I’m gutted for the player and the club and me as a manager that a player like him has left. It got the stage where enough was enough. We had a good session last Thursday and he was the best player – sticking the ball in the net, scoring goals you wouldn’t believe. On the Friday I’m thinking of him playing Saturday and he was unable to train because of his ankle. He would not be at Gateshead if it wasn’t for his injuries. With his desire to be a footballer and suffer those injuries is a shame. It’s a sad thing, but he is 27 and probably going on 47. I wish him all the best and hopefully enjoy his football."

Following this, Brown played part-time for Whitby Town.

In popular culture
Jeff Stelling of Sky Sports, a Hartlepool fan, has been known to exclaim "I feel good!" when Brown scores for Hartlepool, a reference to the more famous James Brown's "I Got You (I Feel Good)". Brown's goals on the opening day of the 2008/09 season against Colchester United led to Jeff Stelling revealing a James Brown singing and dancing doll toy with bobbing head singing "I feel good". In Stelling's book "Jelleyman's Thrown a Wobbly", Stelling reveals that a fan of the show had waited for 3 hours outside hospital which he was visiting for charity to present with the doll to be used whenever James Brown scored.

Personal life
Following his retirement from professional football, Brown started working as a driving instructor.

Career statistics

Club

A.  The "League" column constitutes appearances and goals in The Football League and Football Conference.
B.  The "Other" column constitutes appearances and goals in the FA Trophy, Football League Trophy and play-offs.

Honours

Club
Hartlepool United
Football League Two runners-up: 2006–07

References

External links

James Brown profile at in the Mad Crowd
Vital Hartlepool Profile: James Brown

1987 births
Living people
English footballers
Association football forwards
Hartlepool United F.C. players
Gateshead F.C. players
Whitby Town F.C. players
People from Cramlington
Footballers from Northumberland
English Football League players
National League (English football) players